Judith Wilkinson is a British poet and translator, living in Groningen, the Netherlands. She is known for her translations of Dutch and Flemish poetry into English. She has translated the works of Toon Tellegen, Miriam Van hee, Menno Wigman and Hagar Peeters.

Awards and honours 
 2021: Menno Wigman, The World by Evening, longlisted for the Vondel Prize
 2019: Pushcart Prize, nominated by The Manhattan Review
 2013: Brockway Prize.
 2011: Popescu Prize for European Poetry in Translation for Raptors by Toon Tellegen.
 2009: Runner-up David Reid Poetry Translation Prize.
 2008: First prize David Reid Poetry Translation Prize.
 2007: Poetry Book Society Recommendation for Instead of Silence by Miriam Van hee.
 2007: Runner-up David Reid Poetry Translation Prize.

Poetry collections 

 Judith Wilkinson, In Desert, Shoestring Press 2021
 Judith Wilkinson, Canyon Journey, with artwork by Ditty Doornbos, Shoestring Press 2016
 Judith Wilkinson, Tightrope Dancer, Shoestring Press 2010

Translated titles 
 Hanny Michaelis, In an Unguarded Moment, Selected Poems, Shoestring Press 2022 
 Hagar Peeters, City of Sandcastles, Shoestring Press 2018
 Toon Tellegen, About Love and About Nothing Else, Shoestring Press 2008
 Toon Tellegen, A Man and an Angel, Shoestring Press 2013
 Toon Tellegen, Raptors, Carcanet Press 2011
 Toon Tellegen, Under a Giant Sky, Selected Poems, Shoestring Press 2019
 Miriam Van hee, Instead of Silence, Shoestring Press 2007
 Menno Wigman, The World by Evening, Shearsman Press, 2020
 Maya Wuytack, Nothing Chronic (Except Love), WA Poets Inc 2019

Poetry performed 
The Kosh, Just Below the Surface, poetry by Judith Wilkinson, 1995.

References 

British poets
British translators
Living people
Year of birth missing (living people)